The 1910 Saint Louis Billikens football team was an American football team that represented Saint Louis University during the 1910 college football season. In their first season under head coach John R. Bender, the Billikens compiled a 7–2 record, shut out six of nine opponents, and outscored all opponents by a total of 96 to 22.

Schedule

References

Saint Louis
Saint Louis Billikens football seasons
Saint Louis Billikens football